In the New Zealand Parliament, the shadow leader of the House is traditionally appointed by the largest Opposition party. The position is currently held by Michael Woodhouse, a member of the New Zealand National Party.

List of shadow leaders of the House
The following individuals have been appointed as shadow leader of the New Zealand House of Representatives:

Key

See also

References

Parliament of New Zealand
1986 establishments in New Zealand
Lists of political office-holders in New Zealand